Brad Logan, sometimes called Brad Minus, is an American punk rock guitarist from Los Angeles, California, who also owns and operates Blacknoise Recordings, and has collaborated on projects with Alternative Tentacles. Logan was the frontman and guitarist for hardcore punk band F-Minus but is most famous for his work in the group Leftöver Crack.In 2018, Logan joined Adolescents following the death their founding bassist Steve Soto. 

"Brad Logan" is also the title of a song written about him by Rancid. It is featured on the "Chef Aid" episode of the TV show South Park, as well as on the album Chef Aid: The South Park Album.

Logan has been a roadie for many bands, including Rancid, Social Distortion, Alkaline Trio, NOFX, Chris Robinson of The Black Crowes, Flogging Molly, and Dance Hall Crashers. He has played in numerous underground punk, and experimental bands, including guitar and bass for seminal punk singer Rik L Rik (in his solo band, and in Garbage Hearts). He has also been a substitute touring guitarist for The Unseen, and for electro/anarcho punk band Intro5pect. Logan currently plays in Instant Ruin with Gabba from Chaos UK. In October 2020, Adolescents released their tenth album and their first with Logan, Russian Spider Dump.

Discography

The Crowd
Guitar and vocals
 "Go to the Dentist"- song (1996) 
 Skad- 7" (1997)

Agnostic Front
 Something's Gotta Give- CD, LP (1998) – guitar on "Bloodsucker"

F-Minus
Guitar and vocals:
 Give 'Em the Boot Vol. 1- CD (1998) – track "No Time"
 Give 'Em the Boot Vol. 2- CD (1999) – track "Forget Yourself"
 Give 'Em the Boot Vol. 3- CD (2002) – track "Suburban Blight"
 Give 'Em the Boot Vol. 4- CD (2004) – track "Caught In Between"
 Failed Society- 7" (1998) 
 Won't Bleed Me- 7" (1998) 
 F-Minus S/T- CD, LP (1999)
 Suburban Blight- CD (2001)
 Split With Crack Rock Steady 7 - "Baby Jesus Sliced Up In The Manger"- CD, 10" (2001)
 Wake Up Screaming- CD, LP (2003)
 Sweating Blood- CD, 7" (2003)

Choking Victim
Backing vocals
 No Gods, No Managers- CD, Cass, LP (1999)

Leftöver Crack
Guitar and vocals:
 Mediocre Generica- CD, LP(2001) – Lead guitar track "The Good, The Bad, and The Leftover Crack"
 Fuck World Trade- CD, LP (2004)
 Deadline- CD, LP Leftöver Crack/Citizen Fish split (2006)
 Constructs of the State- CD, LP (2015)

Rats in the Wall
Guitar and vocals
 S/T Cassette Limited 100 press (2013)
 Dead End- CD (2013)
 Warbound- CD,Cass, 7" (2014)
 Discography- CD (2014)

Adolescents
Bass and backing vocals
 Russian Spider Dump- CD, LP (2020)

Instant Ruin
Vocals, guitar, bass
 Hardcore New Wave-  7", Bandcamp (2022)

References

External links
Blacknoise Recordings on Myspace
Official F-Minus site (archived)

Year of birth missing (living people)
Living people
American punk rock guitarists
American male guitarists
Leftöver Crack members